Vladyslav Kreminskyi (born ) is a Ukrainian track cyclist. He competed in the madison event at the 2015 UCI Track Cycling World Championships.

References

External links
 Profile at cyclingarchives.com

1995 births
Living people
Ukrainian track cyclists
Ukrainian male cyclists
Place of birth missing (living people)